Kendall Park is an unincorporated community and census-designated place (CDP) located within South Brunswick Township, in Middlesex County, New Jersey, United States. As of the 2010 United States Census, the CDP's population was 9,339. Kendall Park has a post office with its own ZIP code (08824) that encompasses the entire CDP, as well as some surrounding areas.

Kendall Park gets its name from its builder, Herbert Kendall, who built a planned community of 1,500 houses between 1956 and 1961. Kendall's development was built in three stages: the initial development in 1956-7 (between New Road and Sand Hill Road), the Constable development in 1959 (south of New Road), followed by the Greenbrook development (north of Sand Hill Road) in 1961. The initial development offered two styles of 3-bedroom, 1½ bath ranch-style homes, mostly built on 1/3 acre lots, typically selling for around $16,000 in 1957. The subsequent sections offered a wider selection of styles, including 4-bedroom ranches and 4-bedroom colonial-style homes. The development of Kendall Park doubled the population of South Brunswick Township and marked the beginning of its transformation from a rural farming area to a suburban bedroom community. Several other nearby tracts developed after Kendall's original development are also part of the CDP.

The Hoagland-Clark House, which dates back to the late 18th century, is a remnant of the earlier era, and was identified by Preservation New Jersey as one of the most vulnerable landmarks in New Jersey.

Geography
According to the United States Census Bureau, the CDP had a total area of 3.704 square miles (9.594 km2), including 3.702 square miles (9.589 km2) of land and 0.002 square miles (0.006 km2) of water (0.06%).

U.S. Route 1 passes through the eastern edge of the town. New Jersey Route 27 passes through the western edge.

Demographics

Census 2010

Census 2000
As of the 2000 United States Census there were 9,006 people, 3,013 households, and 2,431 families residing in the CDP. The population density was 934.7/km2 (2,418.4/mi2). There were 3,094 housing units at an average density of 321.1/km2 (830.8/mi2). The racial makeup of the CDP was 79.31% White, 4.53% African American, 0.02% Native American, 13.19% Asian, 0.06% Pacific Islander, 0.97% from other races, and 1.92% from two or more races. Hispanic or Latino of any race were 4.34% of the population.

There were 3,013 households, out of which 45.4% had children under the age of 18 living with them, 69.7% were married couples living together, 7.6% had a female householder with no husband present, and 19.3% were non-families. 16.4% of all households were made up of individuals, and 7.7% had someone living alone who was 65 years of age or older. The average household size was 2.99 and the average family size was 3.37.

In the CDP the population was spread out, with 29.9% under the age of 18, 5.3% from 18 to 24, 32.4% from 25 to 44, 21.6% from 45 to 64, and 10.8% who were 65 years of age or older. The median age was 36 years. For every 100 females, there were 94.9 males. For every 100 females age 18 and over, there were 92.3 males.

The median income for a household in the CDP was $74,438, and the median income for a family was $82,324. Males had a median income of $59,955 versus $40,146 for females. The per capita income for the CDP was $26,986. About 2.0% of families and 2.9% of the population were below the poverty line, including 2.1% of those under age 18 and 9.8% of those age 65 or over.

Education
Cambridge, Constable, Greenbrook, and Brunswick Acres are all elementary schools located within Kendall Park that are part of the South Brunswick Public Schools.

St. Augustine of Canterbury School is PreK-8 elementary school operating under the auspices of the Roman Catholic Diocese of Metuchen. In 2016, the school was one of ten schools in New Jersey, and one of private schools, recognized as a National Blue Ribbon School by the United States Department of Education, a recognition celebrating excellence in academics.

References

Census-designated places in Middlesex County, New Jersey
South Brunswick, New Jersey